Jackson Bark is a community dog park located in, and named after, Jackson Park, Chicago. The dog park is an adaptive reuse of four abandoned tennis courts.  Development began in the spring of 2014.

Accolades
Jackson Bark was named one of the best dog parks in the city by Chicago Reader (2016 & 2017), Chicago Magazine (2017), CBS News Chicago(2016), Foursquare (2017), TaskEasy (2017), Yelp (2017), Curbed Chicago (2018)  and referred to as a "Woofworthy Spot" by RedEye (2017), a "Pup Paradise" by Southside Weekly (2016), as a "Best Dog-Friendly Vacation" spot by Minitime , a "much loved and much needed"  dog park by Jackson Park Watch  and "Best Dog Park in Illinois" by Woof: The Dog Lover's Social and Dating App (2018), and one of the "Top 10 Dog Parks in America’s Biggest Cities" by Hellowdog (2018) 

In 2017, the Chicago Park District endorsed the Tiger Woods Design proposal to expand a golf course in the park to include the Jackson Bark area. As recently as August 2021, plans for the Tiger Woods Design South Shore Jackson Park Golf Course Restoration included the expansion of the Jackson Park Driving Range, which would eliminate Jackson Bark. Originally slated for a 2020 opening, the golf course redesign has encountered opposition from environmental groups and community activists. A non-binding referendum to encourage the city and Chicago Park District to stop removing trees in Jackson Park. In order to preserve these trees at the South Shore Cultural Center we must vote in three precincts on November 8, 2022. Did you know that the three 5th Ward precincts voted overwhelmingly in favor of the same referendum in June 2022?

References

Dog parks in the United States
Parks in Chicago
2014 establishments in Illinois